Ole Sigmund (born May 28, 1966) is a Danish Professor in Mechanical Engineering who has made fundamental contributions  to the field of topology optimization, including microstructure design, nano optics, photonic crystals, Matlab code, acoustics, and fluids. In 2003 he co-authored the highly cited book "Topology Optimization: Theory, Methods and Applications" with Martin P. Bendsøe. His research group was the first to achieve giga-resolution topology optimization, making it for the first time possible to optimize an entire Boeing 777 wing structure.

Education 
Ole Sigmund attended Tornbjerg Gymnasium before enrolling at the Technical University of Denmark, where he earned his MSc in Mechanical Engineering (1991), his PhD in Mechanical Engineering (1995), and his Dr. Techn. (Danish Habilitation) in (2001).

Career
He is a professor (faculty since 1997) at the Technical University of Denmark. He has been a research assistant at Essen University (1991–1992) and Postdoc at Princeton Materials Institute, Princeton University (1995–1996). He has been on sabbatical leave at the University of Colorado Boulder (2012). He is currently a VILLUM Investigator supported by the VILLUM Foundation. 2004–2010 he served as the Chairman of the Danish Center for Applied Mathematics and Mechanics (DCAMM)  and as the elected President of the International Society for Structural and Multidisciplinary Optimization (ISSMO) in the period 2011–2015 (and Executive Member 2015–2023). He was elected member of the Royal Danish Academy of Sciences and Letters in 2008 and the Danish Academy of Technical Sciences (ATV) in 2003.

References 

1966 births
Living people
Academic staff of the Technical University of Denmark
Technical University of Denmark alumni